In the Gospel of Luke alone, Jesus follows the beatitudes with a set of woes. Thus He starts by saying that poverty for the sake of God is the cause of all good, and that hunger and weeping will not be without the reward. Next He denounces the opposite to these as the source of condemnation and punishment. These woes are universal and differ from the woes of the Pharisees.

Scripture

Commentary
The sense of the word woe (Greek: Ου̉̀αὶ, Latin: væ) is commented on by a number of church fathers.
John Chrysostom states that it is, "always said in the Scriptures to those who cannot escape from future punishment." 
St. Gregory likewise notes that it "oftentimes in Scripture denotes the wrath of God and everlasting punishment."

The woe of the rich, echoes the words from the Magnificat in Luke 1:53, "He hath filled the hungry with good things: and the rich he hath sent empty away." So also in the parable of the Rich man and Lazarus Jesus states that the rich, having received their consolation in this world, will have none in the next. Paul also speaks ill of wealth in 1 Timothy 6:9, "for the love of money is the root of all evil."

In terms of being full, St. Basil writes, "to live for pleasure alone is to make a god of one’s stomach" (Phil. 3:19). St. Gregory writes that from the single vice of gluttony come innumerable others which fight against the soul. "Subdue this one vice, and you shall tame many others, because innumerable desires from lust, which follow gluttony. Even though they hold out the promise of enjoyment, they lead to everlasting misery."

Because of the woe of laughter, it was forbidden by St. Basil in his long rules, since "this is a life of penitence and sorrow, but the future one of joy and gladness." St. Augustine notes that "Christ is never said to have laughed, although He often wept." Cornelius a Lapide cites the Book of Sirach, writing, "mirth in moderation, however, is not forbidden to the followers of Christ. 'A fool lifteth up his voice with laughter; but a wise man doth scarce smile a little.' (Ecclus. 21:20, KJV), 'Laughter, I said, is madness. And what does pleasure accomplish?'" (Eccles. 2:2, NIV).

The final woe against being well spoken of, is against the former blessing promised to true prophets, who for the sake of the gospel suffer persecution (Luke 6:22). Likewise St. Paul writes, "For do I now persuade men, or God? or do I seek to please men? for if I yet pleased men, I should not be the servant of Christ." (Gal 1:10, KJV) Cornelius a Lapide notes, "he who preaches false doctrine and things pleasing to the carnal mind, causes his hearers to continue in wickedness and commit many sins, and therefore will receive greater damnation."

See also
 The Law of Christ
 Woes of the Pharisees
 Sermon on the Mount
 Woes to the unrepentant cities

References

Gospel of Luke
Christian terminology
Doctrines and teachings of Jesus
Judaism in the New Testament
Sayings of Jesus